Caribbean Australians are people of Caribbean ancestry who are citizens of Australia.

According to the 2006 Australian census, 4,852 Australians were born in the Caribbean while 4,242 claimed the Caribbean ancestry, either alone or with another ancestry.

Connections between the West Indies and Australia began in the early days of European settlement. Australia’s first newspaper publisher, and founder of the Sydney Gazette in 1803 was George Howe, a white convict from the island of St Christopher. At the height of the British Empire, officers and administrators moved freely between far-flung colonies. Many came to Australia from the West Indies while others, like Edward Eyre, left Australia to take up appointments there.

Black convicts, servants and sailors from the West Indies also arrived in Australia and many of them later integrated into Aboriginal communities. These relationships, and links forged through the sport of boxing, contributed to later alliances between the Black Consciousness Movements in Australia, the USA and the West Indies, including a branch of Marcus Garvey’s UNIA-ACL in Sydney in the 1920s.

Caribbean people were also among the many nationalities flocking to the Victorian goldfields after 1851. One of the thirteen miners killed at the Eureka Stockade was a Jamaican. Arthur Windsor, editor of the Age newspaper from 1872 – 1900 was born in Barbados.

Especially since the abandonment of the White Australia policy, West Indians have arrived from many countries of the Commonwealth. From honky-tonk pianist Winifred Atwell to environmental engineer Ken Potter and writer Ralph de Boissière, they have brought wide-ranging skills, experience and cultural richness to Australia.

See also
Trinidadian and Tobagonian Australians

References 

+
 
Australia